Trino is a comune (municipality) in the Province of Vercelli in the Italian region Piedmont, located about  northeast of Turin and about  southwest of Vercelli, at the foot of the Montferrat hills.

Trino borders the following municipalities: Bianzè, Camino, Costanzana, Fontanetto Po, Livorno Ferraris, Morano sul Po, Palazzolo Vercellese, Ronsecco, and Tricerro.

Trino was the site of Enrico Fermi Nuclear Power Plant. The Romanesque church of San Michele in Insula (built in the 10th–11th centuries) has 12th-century frescoes. The Lucedio Abbey is also located in the municipal territory.

Twin  towns
 Chauvigny, France, since 1961
 Geisenheim, Germany, since 1974
 Banfora, Burkina Faso, since 1999

References